is a railway station on the Jōetsu Line in Maebashi, Gunma, Japan, operated by the East Japan Railway Company (JR East).

Lines

Station layout
The station has a single side platform and a single island platform connected to the station building by a footbridge; however, only one side of the island platform is in use. The station has a Midori no Madoguchi ticket office.

Platforms

History
Gumma-Sōja Station opened on 1 July 1921. Upon the privatization of the Japanese National Railways (JNR) on 1 April 1987, it came under the control of JR East.

Surrounding area
 Shikishima kofun
 Site of Kozuke kokubun-ji
 Sōja Post Office

See also
 List of railway stations in Japan

External links

 Station information (JR East) 

Railway stations in Gunma Prefecture
Railway stations in Japan opened in 1921
Stations of East Japan Railway Company